Wahak Hotrontk also known as San Simon (O'odham) name translates as "Road Dips", is a census-designated place in Pima County, in the U.S. state of Arizona. The population was 120 as of the 2020 census. It is located along Arizona State Route 86 on the Tohono O'odham Nation reservation.

Geography

Located on the west end of the traditional historical village is the San Simon Health Clinic and Tohono O'odham High School. Recently, the fifth convenience store and gas station located on the reservation also opened west of the community.

Population
At the 2020 census there were 120 people, 35 households, and 22 families living in the CDP.  The population density was 78 people per square mile. There were 48 housing units.

The median household income was $22,683. The per capita income for the CDP was $13,577.

Demographics

References

Census-designated places in Pima County, Arizona
Tohono O'odham Nation
Populated places in the Sonoran Desert